Odorín is a village and municipality in the Spišská Nová Ves District in the Košice Region of central-eastern Slovakia.

History
In historical records the village was first mentioned in 1263.

Geography
The village lies at an altitude of 441 metres and covers an area of 9.138 km².
In 2011 had a population of 930 inhabitants.

References

External links

Villages and municipalities in Spišská Nová Ves District